San Diego College of Continuing Education (SDCCE) is a public, noncredit educational institution in San Diego, California.  It is part of the San Diego Community College District along with three two-year community colleges: San Diego City, San Diego Mesa and San Diego Miramar colleges. SDCCE is administered by the San Diego Community College District and is fully accredited by the Western Association of Schools and Colleges. SDCCE is the nation's largest separately-accredited noncredit continuing education institution.

SDCCE offers noncredit career technical education; adult basic education and basic college preparation; life enrichment programs; general interest fee-based community education classes; and customized contract training classes designed for the business sector. Continuing Education serves approximately 40,000 students per year through its seven campuses: CE at Mesa College, CE at Miramar College, Cesar J. Chavez,  the Educational Cultural Complex (ECC), Mid-City, North City and West City; it also conducts programming at various other off-campus sites throughout San Diego. SDCCE is diverse: it is co-educational, multi-generational and multi-ethnic. It has a semester-based academic calendar with an added summer session as a regular part of its offerings.

History
San Diego College of Continuing Education in San Diego began in 1914 when the Board of Education of the San Diego City Schools authorized free night classes for adults in areas such as elementary and secondary basic skills and citizenship instruction. After World War II, adult high school classes were offered to returning veterans. In 1970 a separate community college district was established under a local governing board. In the mid-1970s, more than 100,000 adults were enrolled including Southeast Asian refugees—this gave rise to the large English as a Second Language (ESL) program that is the largest program in SDCCE. On February 1, 2021, San Diego Continuing Education (SDCE) changed its name to San Diego College of Continuing Education to reflect its growth. Today, SDCCE is the largest institution of its kind in the nation with a wide and varied curriculum.

In 2019, San Diego Continuing Education (SDCE) was awarded the title of Heather Van Sickle Entrepreneurial College of the Year, by the National Association for Community College Entrepreneurship (NACCE).

References

External links
 San Diego College of Continuing Education
 San Diego Community College District

Universities and colleges in San Diego
California Community Colleges
Continuing education